was a form of ammunition: a World War II-era combined shrapnel and incendiary anti-aircraft round  used by the Imperial Japanese Navy. The type of layered construction of the warheads were generically referred to as Beehive rounds. The shells were intended to put up a barrage of flame through which any aircraft attempting to attack would have to navigate. However, U.S. pilots considered these shells to be more of a pyrotechnics display than an effective anti-aircraft weapon.

The Sanshiki anti-aircraft shell was designed for several gun calibers, including the 46 cm (18.1-inch) guns of the Yamato-class battleships.

Specifications

46 cm (18.1 in)
The 46 cm (18.1 in) Sanshiki Model 13 round weighed 1,360 kg (2,998 lb) and was filled with 900 incendiary tubes and 600 steel stays. The round was equipped with a delay fuze set before firing that detonated the shell at the set altitude; on explosion, the steel stays and the incendiary tubes were ejected in a 20-degree cone forward, with the shell fragments from the explosion itself further increasing the amount of debris. The rounds were similar to conventional shells, except for their wood-filled ogive and several layers of assembled fragments.

41 cm (16.1 in)
The 41 cm (16.1 in) round contained 1,200 incendiary tubes and on explosion burst into 2,527 fragments. By contrast a 46 cm round burst into 2,846 fragments.

20.3 cm (8 in)
It used the 91 Shiki delay fuze. The burst charge scattered the fragments in a 12 degree cone.

12.7 cm (5 in)

Operational history
The Sanshiki anti-aircraft shells were used for shore bombardment during the Battle for Henderson Field. On 13 October 1942, in order to help protect the transit of an important supply convoy to Guadalcanal that consisted of six slower cargo ships, the Japanese Combined Fleet commander Isoroku Yamamoto sent a naval force from Truk—commanded by Vice-Admiral Takeo Kurita—to bombard Henderson Field. Over the next 83 minutes, they fired 973  shells, of which 104 were Type 3s fired by Kongō. The rest of the shells were 189 Type 0 "Common" shells and 625 Type 1 "HE" shells which fell into the Lunga perimeter, most of them falling in and around the  area of the airfield. The bombardment heavily damaged the airfield's two runways, burned almost all of the available aviation fuel, destroyed 48 of the CAF's ("Cactus Air Force") 90 aircraft, and killed 41 men, including six CAF aircrew.

During the First Naval Battle of Guadalcanal on 13 November 1942, another Japanese naval force attempted to bombard Henderson Field but before they could reach their target they were intercepted by American cruisers and destroyers. The first few salvos from the battleships Hiei and Kirishima consisted of the Sanshiki anti-aircraft shells, as their crews were not expecting a ship-to-ship confrontation and took several minutes to switch to armor-piercing ammunition, with several Sanshiki shells hitting the cruiser USS San Francisco, causing less serious damage than that which would have been inflicted by armor-piercing shells.

Even though the 3 Shiki tsûjôdan shells comprised 40% of the total main ammunition load of the Yamato-class battleships by 1944, they were rarely used in combat against enemy aircraft. The blast of the main guns turned out to disrupt the fire of the smaller antiaircraft guns. In addition the copper drive bands of the rounds were poorly machined and constant firing was damaging to the gun rifling; indeed, one of the shells may have exploded early and disabled one of Musashis guns during the Battle of the Sibuyan Sea. Yamato fired these shells in two separate instances during Operation Ten-Go, first against PBM Mariner flying boats shadowing her, and later against the attacking aircraft of Task Force 58.

See also
During repairs after Operation Tungsten, the 38 cm SK C/34 naval guns of the  Tirpitz were modified to allow their use against aircraft, being supplied with specially-fuzed 38 cm shells for barrage antiaircraft fire.

Notes

References

Ammunition
Incendiary weapons
Anti-aircraft weapons
World War II weapons of Japan